The Mizo National Front ( MNF) is a regional political party in Mizoram, India. MNF emerged from the Mizo National Famine Front, which was formed by Pu Laldenga to protest against the inaction of the Government of India towards the famine situation in the Mizo areas of the Assam state in 1959. It staged a major uprising in 1966, followed by years of underground activities. In 1986, it signed the Mizoram Accord with the Government of India, renouncing secession and violence. The MNF then began contesting elections and has formed state government in Mizoram three times. It is currently the state's ruling party, with its president, Zoramthanga, as the Chief Minister of Mizoram.

Origin
In 1959, the Mizo Hills were devastated by the Mautam, a cyclic phenomenon where the flowering of bamboo plants result in a plague of crop-eating rats, in turn causing a famine.

Earlier in 1955, Mizo Cultural Society was formed, with Laldenga as its secretary. In March 1960, the name of the Mizo Cultural Society was changed to 'Mautam Front'. During the famine of 1959–1960, this society took lead in demanding relief and attracted the attention of all sections of the people. In September 1960, the Society adopted the name Mizo National Famine Front (MNFF). The MNFF gained considerable popularity as a large number of Mizo Youth assisted in transporting rice and other essential commodities to interior villages.

Underground movement

The MNFF, which was originally formed to help ease the immense sufferings of the people during the severe Mautam Famine in Mizoram, was converted into Mizo National Front (MNF) on 22 October 1961. The first OB leaders elected were, President Laldenga, Vice President JF Manliana, General Secy. R. Vanlawma, and Treasurer Rochhinga and the ways in which the Indian authority of the day handled the famine left the people disillusioned. The wave of secessionist and armed insurrection was running high among the Mizos. In 1966, MNF led a major uprising against the government, but failed to gain administrative control of the Mizo district. The secessionist movement held on for about two decades. During that time, they invaded Burma claiming Chin State and Tahan belong to Mizoram since most of the resident in Tahan are Mizo.

Peace settlement

This chapter of insurgency finally came to a close with the signing of the Mizoram Accord on 30 June 1986 between the underground government of the Mizo National Front and the Government of India. Under the terms of the peace accord, Mizoram was granted statehood in February 1987.

Political party

After the 1987 Mizoram Legislative Assembly election, Laldenga became Chief Minister, but soon lost power due to defections in the party. In the resulting election, the Congress won, and the MNF would be in opposition until 1998. In 1990, Laldenga died, and was replaced by his former secretary and Finance Minister, Zoramthanga. In 1998 and 2003 MNF won the state assembly elections, and Zoramthanga was chief minister for 10 years. In the 2003 elections MNF won 21 out of 40 seats in the state assembly, and got 132 505 votes (31.66%). The party was routed by the Congress in the 2008 state election, winning just 3 seats. It contested the 2013 state elections in alliance with the Mizoram People's Conference, and won 5 seats to the Congress's 34. In the 2018 state assembly elections, the MNF won 26 seats and returned to government.

Role in the national elections
For the 2014 Lok Sabha elections, it formed an alliance called United Democratic Front with seven other parties including BJP, to contest the only seat in Mizoram. The MNF has been part of the National Democratic Alliance since 2014.

Election results

Mizoram Legislative Assembly

List of Chief Ministers

Current party officers

As of the latest party election in 2019, the Officers are:
 President: Zoramthanga
 Senior Vice President: Tawnluia
 Vice Presidents: Vanlalzawma and Lalthlengliana
 Treasurer: K. Vanlalauva

See also
 Mizoram People's Conference
 Zoram Nationalist Party
 Zoram People's Movement
 Indian National Congress
 Political parties in Mizoram

References

External links
 Peace Accord 1986
 MPs of Mizoram
 Mizo National Front campaign song recorded 1993

 
Political parties in Mizoram
Political parties established in 1961
1961 establishments in Assam